Elections were held for seats reserved for the party-list representation in the House of Representatives of the Philippines on May 13, 2013. At most 10% of the seats in the House of Representatives of the Philippines are reserved for party-list representatives. The election was via the party-list system, with a 2% "soft" election threshold via the Hare quota, except that no party can win more than 3 seats, and if the seats won do not reach the 20% of the seats of the entire House of Representatives, the parties that have yet to win seats will get a seat each until the 20% reserved for party-lists have been filled up.

Party-list purge
The Commission on Elections (Comelec) purged the parties participating in the party-list election from almost 200 parties in the 2010 election to just over 100. However, most of the disqualified party-lists successfully got restraining orders from the Supreme Court to retain their names on the ballot. On April 6, 2013, the Supreme Court changed its earlier ruling on what are the criteria set for joining in the party-list election to a more liberal interpretation. With this, the court gave back the cases of the disqualified parties to the Comelec for consideration under the new interpretation.

Raffle
The Comelec also raffled the parties on the order that they will appear on the ballot. This is to avoid parties using numbers or the letter "A" as the first letter of their party to be seen first by the voter.

Nominees

The Comelec released the list of nominees of every party that appeared on the ballot.

Results

2013 Philippine general election
Party-list elections in the Philippines